Gorakhpur Airport  is a domestic airport and an Indian Air Force base serving the city of Gorakhpur, in the state of Uttar Pradesh, India. The Airports Authority of India (AAI) operates it as a civil enclave at the Air Force base. In June 2017, the passenger terminal was inaugurated by the Chief Minister of Uttar Pradesh, Yogi Adityanath.

Air Force Station Gorakhpur 
The airport is one of the bases of the Indian Armed Forces (IAF), which operates under Central Air Command of the Indian Air Force. IAF operates No. 16 Squadron IAF, No. 27 Squadron IAF and No. 105 Helicopter Unit from here. These squadrons have regular military exercises; other than this, they actively take part in rescue operations. SEPECAT Jaguar aircraft and Mil Mi-17 helicopters are based here.

Infrastructure

The existing terminal can handle 200 passengers in peak hours, and has an area of 23,500 sq.ft.

Equipped with two conveyor belts in the arrival hall, 10 check-in-counters, escalators, lifts, restaurant and an additional security holding area in the first floor, the extended terminal building will be able to handle the 200 passengers during peak hours.

Airlines and destinations

{{Airport-dest-list
|Alliance Air|Delhi, Kolkata (begins 28 March 2023), Lucknow 
|IndiGo| Bangalore, Delhi, Hyderabad, Kolkata, Mumbai, Prayagraj (ends April 12, 2023)
|SpiceJet|Delhi, Mumbai<ref name=LiveHindustan>

Statistics

Future
Due to limited expansion options available, and restrictions enforced by the Airports Authority of India (AAI), the airport will not be able to cope with the growing demand for future air traffic. Hence, a new greenfield airport at an area of 300 acres has been proposed on near NH-24 and also near the under-construction Gorakhpur Link Expressway.

See also
Airports in India
List of the busiest airports in India

References 

Indian Air Force bases
Airports in Uttar Pradesh
Transport in Gorakhpur
Buildings and structures in Gorakhpur
Airports with year of establishment missing